Saynakhonevieng Phommapanya (born 28 October 1987 in Vientiane) is a Laotian professional footballer. He played for Vientiane FC, Yotha FC and Lao Toyota FC and was a member of the Laos national team.

In 2017, Phommapanya was banned from ever taking part in football-related activities ever again due to match-fixing.

International goals

References

External links 
 Profile

1987 births
Living people
People from Vientiane
Laotian footballers
Laos international footballers
Yotha F.C. players
Lao Toyota F.C. players
Association football defenders
Footballers at the 2014 Asian Games
Asian Games competitors for Laos